Nova Vas pri Markovcih is a settlement on the regulated left bank of the Drava River in the Municipality of Markovci in northeastern Slovenia. The area is part of the traditional region of Styria. It is now included with the rest of the municipality in the Drava Statistical Region.

References

External links
Nova Vas pri Markovcih on Geopedia

Populated places in the Municipality of Markovci